The term Kniefall von Warschau, also referred to as Warschauer Kniefall (both German for "Warsaw genuflection"), refers to West German Chancellor Willy Brandt kneeling and giving a moment of silence during a visit to a Warsaw Ghetto Uprising memorial in 1970.

Incident
The event took place on December 7, 1970, in Warsaw, Poland (which was then part of the Eastern Bloc), during a visit to a monument to the German occupation-era Warsaw Ghetto Uprising. After laying a wreath, Brandt unexpectedly, and apparently spontaneously, knelt. He remained silently in that position for a short time (half a minute), surrounded by a large group of dignitaries and press photographers. Brandt had actively resisted the early Nazi regime, and had spent most of the time of Hitler's reign in exile. The occasion of Brandt's visit to Poland at the time was the signing of the Treaty of Warsaw between West Germany and Poland, guaranteeing German acceptance of the new borders of Poland. The treaty was one of the Brandt-initiated policy steps (the 'Ostpolitik') to ease tensions between West and East during the Cold War.

Reactions

In Germany

On the same day, Brandt signed the Treaty of Warsaw, which acknowledged the Oder–Neisse line as the final German border with Poland. Both actions attracted controversy within Germany, as did Ostpolitik in general, which was supported by only a narrow majority of the people and had opposition within Brandt's own Social Democratic Party. Its voters had included a significant proportion of expellees from the formerly-German territories in Poland, most of whom left to support the conservative parties.

According to a Der Spiegel survey of the time, 48% of all West Germans thought the Kniefall was excessive, 41% said it was appropriate and 11% had no opinion. Brandt's victory in the next elections, in late 1972, was also due to the growing view among voters that Brandt's Ostpolitik, symbolized by the Kniefall, and his reformist domestic policies were helping to boost Germany's international reputation and so should be supported. His party won its best federal election result ever.

Internationally

While at the time positive reactions may have been limited, his show of humility was a small but vital step in bridging the gaps World War II had left between Germany and Eastern Europe. In historical terms, Brandt gained much renown for this act. He was named Time Person of the Year in 1970, with the magazine highlighting the Kniefall as one of the main reasons for his recognition, and it is thought to be one of the reasons he received the Nobel Peace Prize in 1971.

A monument to Willy Brandt was unveiled on 6 December 2000, in Willy Brandt Square in Warsaw (near the Warsaw Ghetto Heroes Monument) on the eve of the 30th anniversary of his famous gesture.

Brandt's memories
Brandt was repeatedly interviewed about the genuflection and about his motives. He later noted that:

(German original) "Am Abgrund der deutschen Geschichte und unter der Last der Millionen Ermordeten tat ich, was Menschen tun, wenn die Sprache versagt"

(English translation) At the abyss of German history and under the weight of millions of murdered people, I did what people do when language fails.

Egon Bahr, an eyewitness and Brandt's friend and political ally of many years, recalled in a 2010 interview: "The only thing he said was that in that moment facing the ribbon, he thought: Just laying the wreath is not enough."

Similar act
During a visit to the former Seodaemun Prison in Seoul in August 2015, former Japanese prime minister Yukio Hatoyama knelt in front of a memorial stone as an expression of apology for Japanese war crimes in World War II.

See also
 Letter of Reconciliation of the Polish Bishops to the German Bishops

References

External links
 Photo of the Kniefall (photographer: Engelbert Reineke)
 Cover of German news magazine "Der Spiegel" with image of Brandt in front of the monument (photographer: Sven Simon)
 Photo of the Kniefall including wreath, Photographer Hanns Hubmann

History of Warsaw
Holocaust commemoration
Germany–Poland relations
1970 in Poland
1970 in Germany
1970 in international relations
Kneeling
Willy Brandt